Ramanujar is an Indian Tamil historical soap opera, written by former Chief Minister of Tamil Nadu Dr. M.Karunanidhi, starring Gowsik, Chanthirakanth, Gayathiri and Lakshmiraj. It aired Monday through Friday on Kalaignar TV from 1 June 2015 to 27 January 2017 at 7:30PM IST for 433 episodes. It had been receiving the highest ratings of Tamil serials and received high praising from viewers.

Plot summary
The story revolves around the life of the Vaishnavite Acharya, Ramanujar and his contributions to the Hindu religion.

Cast

 Gowsik as Ramanuja
 Chanthirakanth as Nathamunigal
 Gayathiri as Ganthimathi
 Lakshmiraj as Kesava Somayaji (Died in serial)
 Balaji as Alavanthar ( Yamunacharya)
 Girish Ayapath as Periyanambigal
 Senthil as Marthandam
 Jayalaskhmi as Patti
 Vijay Prasadh as Eswara Battar
 K.R.S Kumar as Yadavaprakasar
 Suresh as Thirumalai Nambigal
 Ananth as Thirukoshti Nambigal
 Deepak as Maraner Nambi
 Ranganathan as Manakkal Nambi
 Aruna
 Pranav
 S.S.Vasan as Uyyakondar
 Dhanush as Thirukatchi Nambi
 Nakshatra as Thanjamaambal
 Syamanta Kiran as Andal (Koorathazhwan's wife)

Production
The series was written by Karunanidhi, who also wrote the popular historical series Romapuri Pandian (2014-2016) and Thenpandi Singam. The drama marked his third collaboration with creative director and producer Kutty Padmini.

International broadcast
The Series was released on 1 June 2015 on Kalaignar TV. The Show was also broadcast internationally on Channel's international distribution. It aired in Sri Lanka, Singapore, Malaysia, South East Asia, Middle East, Oceania, South Africa and Sub Saharan Africa on Kalaignar TV and also aired in United States, Canada, Europe on Kalaignar Ayngaran TV. The show's episodes were released on Kalaignar TV YouTube channel.

  It airs in the Indian state of Andhra Pradesh on TTD Bhakthi channel Dubbed in Telugu language.

References

External links
 

Kalaignar TV television series
Tamil-language historical television series
Tamil-language children's television series
2015 Tamil-language television series debuts
Tamil-language television shows
2017 Tamil-language television series endings